Domivânio Alves de Souza Júnior, commonly known as Júnior Alves or simply Domivânio (born 20 March 1994), is a Brazilian footballer who plays as an attacking midfielder for Taguatinga.

Career
Born in Buritis, Minas Gerais, Júnior Alves joined Portuguesa's youth categories in November 2010, aged 16, after starting it out at Brasilis. On 12 August 2014 he was called up by manager Silas for the match against ABC.

Júnior Alves made his first team debut on the same day, playing the last 30 minutes of a 0–0 away draw for the Campeonato Brasileiro Série B championship.

References

External links

1994 births
Living people
Sportspeople from Minas Gerais
Brazilian footballers
Association football midfielders
Campeonato Brasileiro Série B players
Campeonato Brasileiro Série D players
Associação Portuguesa de Desportos players
Villa Nova Atlético Clube players
Maringá Futebol Clube players
Clube Sociedade Esportiva players
Ceilândia Esporte Clube players
Corumbaense Futebol Clube players